Naba is a Nilo-Saharan language spoken by approximately 900,000 people in Chad. Those who speak this language are called Lisi, a collective name for three closely associated ethnic groups, the Bilala, the Kuka and the Medogo, that represent the three dialects in which Naba is subdivided. They live mainly in the Batha Prefecture, but the Kuka are also in Chari-Baguirmi. Ethnologue estimates the lexical similarity among the three dialects to be no less than 99%. Arabic is often known as a second language.

References

External links
A paper on an aspect of Bilala

Languages of Chad
Bongo–Bagirmi languages